Ernst Meister (3 September 1911 – 15 June 1979) was a German poet and writer.

Meister's poetry falls within a dark abstract landscape of existentialism, with tortured themes influenced by his experiences during World War II.  In his 1976 collection of poems, Im Zeitspalt ("In Time's Rift"), Meister frankly addresses mortality and the nothingness of our existence as both mind and body decay into death.  His poetry is noted for is spare brevity and difficult syntax and has been compared to the work of Romanian poet Paul Celan (1920–1970), Meister's contemporary in German letters.  However, despite writing 16 collections of verse, Meister was not involved with the dominant literary and cultural elite and his works were relatively unknown during his lifetime.

Biography
Ernst Meister was raised in Hagen, Germany.

He studied theology, literature, art history, and philosophy (the latter under Karl Löwith and Hans-Georg Gadamer) at various German universities before enlisting as a soldier in the Second World War.  A number of war-related experiences are worked into his poems, stories, radio plays, and stage plays.  His first major publication, Austellung, appeared in 1932, following which he published nothing for two decades.  This period of silence ultimately gave way to the prolific last third of his life.  Between 1953 and 1979, Meister produced more than 16 volumes of verse along with a number of other literary and visual works.

He received a number of awards in his lifetime, including the Annette von Droste-Hülshoff Prize in 1957, the Great Art Prize of North Rhine-Westphalia in 1963, the Petrarch Prize in 1976, and the Rainer Maria Rilke Prize for Poetry jointly with Sarah Kirsch in 1978. Meister was posthumously given the most prestigious award in German literature, the Georg Büchner Prize, having been informed of the honor days before his death.

He has champions within Germany literature, having been a mentor to the poet and novelist Nicolas Born and leaving many to grapple with his place in the German canon.

Works
Poetry
 1932: Ausstellung (trans. Exhibition)
 1953: Unterm schwarzen Schafspelz (trans. Under Black Sheep's Clothing)
 1954: Dem Spiegelkabinett gegenüber
 1972: Sage vom Ganzen den Satz
 1976: Im Zeitspalt (trans. In Time's Rift)
 1979: Wandloser Raum
 In Time's Rift [Im Zeitspalt] , Translated by Graham Foust and Samuel Frederick, Wave Books, 2012
 Wallless Space , Translated by Graham Foust and Samuel Frederick, Wave Books, 2014

References

Notes

Further reading
 Dove, Richard (1980), Poems by Ernst Meister, Translated and Introduced, in Bold, Christine (ed.), Cencrastus No. 2, Spring 1980, pp. 26 - 29.
 Foust, Graham and Frederick, Samuel. "On Ernst Meister". Poetry Society of America.

External links

 Author page at Wave Books

German poets
20th-century German philosophers
German male poets
German-language poets
1911 births
1979 deaths
Officers Crosses of the Order of Merit of the Federal Republic of Germany